Isbell may refer to:

People
Alvertis Isbell (born 1940), American musician, songwriter, producer
Arnold J. Isbell (1899–1945), American naval officer
Cecil Isbell (1915–1985), American football player
Frank Isbell (1875–1941), American baseball player
Harris Isbell (1910-1994), American physician
Jane Isbell (1927-1981), American actress
Jason Isbell (born 1979), American musician
Jeffrey Dean Isbell (Izzy Stradlin) (born 1962), American musician
Joe Isbell (born 1940), American football player
John R. Isbell (1930–2005) American mathematician
Larry Isbell (1930–1978), American football player
Lynne Isbell (born 1955), American anthropologist 
Marion William Isbell (1904-1988), American founder of Ramada Motels
Ruwellyn Isbell (born 1993), South African rugby union player
Virginia Isbell, American politician
Charles Lee Isbell, Jr., American computer scientist

Places
Isbell, unincorporated town in Franklin County, Alabama, United States, est. 1818
Isbell Field, an airport near Fort Payne, Alabama, United States
Mount Isbell, a mountain of Geologists Range, Churchill Mountains, Antarctica

Miscellaneous
Hurricane Isbell, a storm of the 1964 Atlantic hurricane season
Isbell Middle School, a middle school in Santa Paula, California, United States
, an American naval destroyer

See also
Isabel (disambiguation)